This article lists the presidents of São Tomé and Príncipe, an island country in the Gulf of Guinea off the western equatorial coast of Central Africa, since the establishment of the office of president in 1975. Manuel Pinto da Costa was the first person to hold the office, taking effect on 12 July 1975. The incumbent is Carlos Vila Nova, having taken office on 2 October 2021.

List of officeholders
Political parties

Other factions

Symbols

Timeline

Latest election

See also

 Politics of São Tomé and Príncipe
 List of prime ministers of São Tomé and Príncipe
 List of presidents of the Regional Government of Príncipe
 Ministry of Foreign Affairs, Cooperation and Communities
 List of governors of Portuguese São Tomé and Príncipe

References

External links
 World Statesmen – São Tomé and Príncipe

Sao Tome and Principe, Presidents
Presidents
 
1975 establishments in São Tomé and Príncipe